Grozav is a Romanian surname. Notable people with the surname include: 

Gheorghe Grozav (born 1990), Romanian footballer
Ligia Grozav (born 1994), Romanian high jumper
Vasile Grozav (born 1950), Moldovan politician

Romanian-language surnames